Maximilian Müller (born 11 July 1987) is a field hockey player from Germany. Born in Nuremberg, he was a member of the men's national teams that won the gold medal at the 2008 and 2012 Summer Olympics. He is now captain of the German team.

References

The Official Website of the Beijing 2008 Olympic Games

External links
 

1987 births
Living people
German male field hockey players
Olympic field hockey players of Germany
Field hockey players at the 2008 Summer Olympics
Olympic gold medalists for Germany
Field hockey players at the 2012 Summer Olympics
Olympic medalists in field hockey
Medalists at the 2012 Summer Olympics
Medalists at the 2008 Summer Olympics
Sportspeople from Nuremberg
2014 Men's Hockey World Cup players
21st-century German people